The Finnish Church is a church building in Gamla stan in Stockholm, Sweden. Belonging to the Stockholm Finnish Parish of the Church of Sweden, it was opened in 1725 after the Lilla Bollhuset building had been rebuilt into a church.

See also
Bollhustäppan

References

External links

18th-century Church of Sweden church buildings
Churches in Stockholm
Churches completed in 1725
1725 establishments in Sweden
Churches in the Diocese of Stockholm (Church of Sweden)
Defunct real tennis venues